Transmembrane protein 53, or TMEM53, is a protein that is encoded on chromosome 1 in humans.  It has no paralogs but is predicted to have many orthologs across eukaryotes.

Properties and Structure

General Properties 
 DUF829 makes up 87% of TMEM53's length
 Contains a transmembrane domain but lacks a signal peptide
 Molecular weight 31.6 kilodaltons
 Isoelectric point 8.56
 Leucine-rich (14.4% of amino acids are leucines)
 Predicted to be localized to the nucleus

Secondary Structure 
The secondary structure of TMEM53 is predicted to consist of alternating pairs of alpha helices and beta sheets.

Alternative Splicing 
TMEM53 has 3 exons. Twelve alternative splice forms have been identified using 26 alternative exons.  The following table includes the predicted post-translational modifications for each isoform.

Function 
The function of TMEM53 is not fully understood.  It contains a domain of unknown function, DUF829, which is approximately 240 amino acids long.  This domain has not been found in proteins other than TMEM53 and its orthologs.

Expression 
Based on human and mouse EST profiles and a human tissue GEO profile, TMEM53 appears to be expressed ubiquitously at low levels in both normal and cancerous tissues.

More specific expression patterns have also been observed:
 Expressed in mice at higher levels in dorsal root ganglia than in the spinal cord
 Expressed at lower levels in brain tissue with Huntington's disease than in normal brain tissue
 Expressed at very low levels in the mouse brain, with the areas of highest detectable expression being the hypothalamus, pons, midbrain, and amygdala

Homology 
Transmembrane protein 53 has no paralogs.  It does, however, have orthologs extending throughout eukaryotes, from primates to amoeba.  The following table presents a selection of orthologs found using searches in BLAST and BLAT.  It is not a comprehensive list, but rather a small selection meant to display the diversity of species in which orthologs are found.

Based on ClustalW multiple sequence alignments of 38 orthologs, including the ones above, 11 amino acids are completely conserved throughout all species with this protein.

Predicted Post-Translational Modification 
Using bioinformatic analysis tools like MyHits Motif Scan and various tools at ExPASy and comparing to multiple sequence alignments, highly conserved potential sites of post-translational modification were identified.  The following is not a comprehensive list of predicted modification sites; it includes only the ones that use highly conserved amino acids.
 CK2 phosphorylation sites 140-143, 217-220
 Tyrosine phosphorylation sites 209-216, 263
 PKC phosphorylation site 19-21 conserved in mammals
 N-myristoylation site 27-32 conserved in mammals
 N-myristoylation site 153-158 conserved in vertebrates

T216, the tyrosine for a tyrosine phosphorylation site, and S217, the serine for a predicted CK2 phosphorylation site, are completely conserved throughout the protein's evolutionary history.  This suggests high likelihood that these sites are real and important for the protein's function.

References